The Tenerife goldcrest, Regulus regulus teneriffae, (sometimes considered a separate species, R. teneriffae) is a very small passerine bird in the kinglet family, closely resembling the goldcrest but with a broader black band across the forehead, slightly darker underparts and a longer bill. It breeds in the Canary Islands of Tenerife and La Gomera, where it is a non-migratory resident. It prefers Canary Island Pine forests, but also occurs in laurisilva forests.

The populations on La Palma and El Hierro, previously thought to belong to this taxon, are now recognized as, at least, a distinct subspecies, the Western Canary Islands goldcrest R. (r.) ellenthalerae (Päckert et al., 2006), which evolved from an independent colonisation of the islands.

References
  Database entry includes justification for why this species is of least concern
 Päckert, Martin; Dietzen, Christian; Martens, Jochen; Wink, Michael & Kvist, Laura: Radiation of Atlantic goldcrests Regulus regulus spp.: evidence of a new taxon from the Canary Islands. Journal of Avian Biology 37(4): 364–380. Digital Object Identifier: 10.1111/j.2006.0908-8857.03533.x HTML abstract Electronic Appendices

Regulus (bird)
Birds of the Canary Islands
Birds described in 1883
Endemic fauna of the Canary Islands
Subspecies
Taxa named by Henry Seebohm

fr:Roitelet de Teneriffe